Svetlana Kirdina-Chandler (Светла́на Гео́ргиевна Ки́рдина-Чэндлер) is a Russian sociologist and economist. Scientific career began in the Novosibirsk School of Economic Sociology. Doctor of Social Sciences, PhD. Research interests: sociological theory, institutions, economic theory, the theory of institutional matrices, transients in Russian society. Author of over 160 scientific papers, the most important of which are devoted to the development and applications of the theory of institutional matrix.
She introduced two main and particular interdependent types of institutional matrices existing
around the world, X-matrices and Y-matrices.

The main scientific results is proposed and developed the theoretical concept of institutional matrices, the essence of which is to provide a social and economic structure in the form of a combination of two matrices of basic institutions. In this case, one of the matrices has historically dominant character. The concept empirically confirmed extensive historical material and data of modern Russian and Comparative Studies, and served as the basis of weather institutional dynamics of Russian society, confirmed in practice.

Svetlana Kirdina is a stepsister of Alexander Gorban.

References

External links
 personal site
 Svetlana Kirdina on GOOGLE Scholar
 Svetlana Kirdina on Academia.edu
 Svetlana Kirdina on RePEc Author Service
 Svetlana Kirdina as the initiator of NSU`s alumni association (in Russian)

Living people
Economic historians
Russian economists
Russian women economists
Russian sociologists
Russian women sociologists
1955 births
Novosibirsk State University alumni